Takut Ke Tak is a 2020 Malaysian Malay-language comedy horror film. It tells the story of five university students who shoots an authentic horror movie in a haunted house, but they ended up haunted by the cheap scares and ghosts living there.

It is released at cinemas on 27 August 2020 in Malaysia and Brunei.

Synopsis 
Five film students team up to complete their final year project together. Tired of cliches in almost all horror films, they decide to shoot an authentic horror film that does not use cheap scares. But their plan to shoot a film in a haunted house now turns into a nightmare, because when they stays at the house filming, they begin feeling like they are in an actual horror movie, because every horror film cliche happens on them. And the ghosts want to be part of their film too. Can they escape?

Cast 
 Nabil Aqil as Abbas
 Fabian Loo as Yang Guo
 Ika Nabila as Linda
 Arwind Kumar as Sivar
 Han Zalini as Amir
 Daniella Sya as Beauty Ghost
 Delimawati as Nenek Moyang
 Ropie Cecupak as Professor
 Sherry Aljeffri as Scary Granny

Release
The film features local well-known newcomers and multi-ethnic cast, including actor and model Nabil Aqil, actor Fabian Loo, influencer Arwind Kumar, actress Ika Nabella, and musician Han Zalini. The film was originally scheduled to be released on 2 April 2020, but was delayed due to COVID-19 pandemic.

References

External links 
 
 Check cinema location and showtimes: Malaysia

Malaysian comedy horror films
Malay-language films
2020 films
2020 comedy horror films